Elections to Liverpool City Council were held on 6 May 1980.

Following boundary changes, the entire council was up for election (3 Councillors for each ward). The candidates with the highest number of votes in each ward were elected until 1984, the candidates with the second highest number of votes were elected until 1983 and the candidates with the third highest number of votes were elected until 1982.

After the election, the composition of the council was:

Election result

Ward results

* - Councillor seeking re-election

(PARTY) - Party of former Councillor

Abercromby

Aigburth

Allerton

Anfield

Arundel

Breckfield

Broadgreen

Childwall

Church

Clubmoor

County

Croxteth

Dingle

Dovecot

Everton

Fazakerley

Gillmoss

Granby

Grassendale

Kensington

Melrose

Netherley

Old Swan

Picton

Pirrie

St. Mary's

Smithdown

Speke

Tuebrook

Valley

Vauxhall

Warbreck

Woolton

References

1980
1980 English local elections
1980s in Liverpool